Hilde Krahl (10 January 1917 – 28 June 1999) was an Austrian film actress. She appeared in 70 films between 1936 and 1994. She was born Hildegard Kolačný in Brod, Austria-Hungary (now Slavonski Brod, Croatia) in 1917, and she died in Vienna, Austria in 1999. In 1944 she married Wolfgang Liebeneiner; their daughter Johanna Liebeneiner also became a famous actress.

Filmography

 Die Puppenfee (1936)
 Mädchenpensionat (1936)
 Lumpaci the Vagabond (1936)
 Serenade (1937)
 Gastspiel im Paradies (1938)
 Der Hampelmann (1938)
 The Merciful Lie (1939)
 Der Weg zu Isabel (1940)
 Donauschiffer (1940)
 Herz – modern möbliert (1940)
 Der Postmeister (1940)
 The Comedians (1941)
 Her Other Self (1941)
 Anuschka (1942)
 Meine Freundin Josefine (1942)
 Melody of a Great City (1943)
 Dreaming (1944)
 Life Goes On (1945)
 Love '47 (1949)
 Law of Love (1949)
 My Niece Susanne (1950)
 Shadows in the Night (1950)
 When a Woman Loves (1950)
  White Shadows (1951)
 Gateway to Peace (1951)
 A Devil of a Woman (1951)
 No Greater Love (1952)
 1. April 2000 (1952)
 Die Venus vom Tivoli (1953)
 The Mosquito (1954)
 The Eternal Waltz (1954)
 Hochstaplerin der Liebe (1954)
 Children, Mother, and the General (1955)
 The Doctor's Secret (1955)
 One Woman Is Not Enough? (1955)
 Night of Decision (1956)
 My Father, the Actor (1956)
 A Glass of Water (1960)
 Terror After Midnight (1962)
  (1963)
 Derrick - Season 3, Episode 9: "Ein unbegreiflicher Typ" (1976, TV)

External links
 
 Photographs and literature

1917 births
1999 deaths
Austrian film actresses
Croatian Austro-Hungarians
Croatian people of Czech descent
Austrian people of Czech descent
People from Slavonski Brod
Best Actress German Film Award winners
Commanders Crosses of the Order of Merit of the Federal Republic of Germany
Burials at the Ostfriedhof (Munich)
20th-century Austrian actresses